Soyuz TM-26 was a Russian spaceflight that ferried cosmonauts and supplies to Mir. It was the 32nd expedition to Mir. It was launched by a Soyuz-U rocket from Baikonur Cosmodrome on August 5, 1997. The main mission was to transport two specially-trained cosmonauts to repair or salvage the troubled space station.

TM-26 docked with Mir on August 7 by manual control. The crew repaired the power cable and harness/connectors in the severely damaged Spektr module and restored much of the lost power; they also repaired and replaced the oxygen generators in Mir. The hole(s) in that module that caused total depressurization of the module could not be located during their spacewalk inside that module.

During the flight a television advertisement starring Vasily Tsibliyev was filmed on the station. The ad, for Tnuva's brand of UHT milk, was the first ad to be filmed in space.

Crew

References

Crewed Soyuz missions
Spacecraft launched in 1997